The 1945 Wichita Shockers football team represented the Municipal University of Wichita in the 1945 college football season. In their second and final year under head coach Melvin J. Binford, the Shockers compiled a 6–2 record during the season. The Shockers participated in their first year in the Missouri Valley Conference and compiled a 1–1 conference record en route to a third-place finish in conference play.

Schedule

References

Wichita State Shockers football seasons
1945 Missouri Valley Conference football season
Wichita Shockers football